Don't Let Go is an album by pianist Ben Sidran featuring performances recorded in 1974 and released on the Blue Thumb label.

Reception

The AllMusic review states "This is a killer, adventurous record from a magical time that doesn't sound a bit dated in the 21st century".

Track listing
All compositions by Ben Sidran except as indicated
 "Fat Jam" (James P. Cooke) – 3:25
 "House of Blue Lites" (Don Raye, Freddie Slack) – 3:13
 "Ben Sidran's Midnite Tango" – 2:40
 "The Chicken Glide" – 3:45
 "She's Funny That Way (I Got a Woman, Crazy for Me)" (Neil Moret, Richard Whiting) – 3:36
 "Monopoly" (Bud Powell) – 1:31
 "Don't Let Go" – 3:18
 "Hey Hey Baby" (James P. Cooke) – 3:31
 "The Foolkiller" (Mose Allison) – 3:44
 "The Funky Elephant" (Ben Sidran, James P. Cooke, Kip Merklein, Clyde Stubblefield) – 3:30
 "Snatch" – 3:51
 "Down to the Bone" – 1:16

Personnel
Ben Sidran – piano, vocals
Bunky Green – alto saxophone
Sonny Seals – tenor saxophone
Jerry Alexander – harmonica
Jim Peterman – organ
James P. Cooke – guitar
Phil Upchurch – guitar, bass, drums, percussion
Randy Fullerton, Kip Merklein (track 10) – bass 
Clyde Stubblefield, George Brown – drums, percussion
 Tom Piazza – drums (track 8)
Sonny Burke – horn arrangement
Unidentified string section arranged by Les Hooper

References

Blue Thumb Records albums
Ben Sidran albums
1974 albums